The masked cardinal (Paroaria nigrogenis) is a bird species in the tanager family (Thraupidae). It is not very closely related to the cardinals proper (Cardinalidae).

It is found in Trinidad, far north-eastern Colombia and northern Venezuela. It was previously considered conspecific with the red-capped cardinal (Paroaria gularis), from which it differs by the black ear-coverts and the red (not black) lower throat and upper chest. Additionally, its lower mandible is typically whitish, but this is not entirely consistent, as it occasionally is pale flesh-coloured. This distinctive taxon as a distinct species, as suggested by the lack of hybridization with P. g. gularis in the limited area of overlap in southern Venezuela. The common name masked cardinal was suggested.

References

 Restall, Robin L.; Rodner, C. & Lentino, M. (2006): Birds of Northern South America. Christopher Helm, London.  (vol. 1).  (vol. 2).

External links

masked cardinal
Birds of Trinidad and Tobago
Birds of Venezuela
masked cardinal